Brand safety is a set of measures that aim to protect the image and reputation of brands from the negative or damaging influence of questionable or inappropriate content when advertising online.

In response to ads being placed next to undesirable content, companies have cut advertising budgets, and pulled ads from online advertising and social media platforms.

Types of unsafe environments 
The global digital advertising industry considers the "Dirty Dozen" categories to avoid. The Interactive Advertising Bureau (IAB) added a 13th category: fake news.

Military conflict 
Obscenity
Drugs
Tobacco
Adult 
Arms 
Crime
Death/injury
Online piracy
Hate speech
Terrorism
Spam/harmful sites 
Fake news

In addition, companies will often define specific unsafe categories based on the brand itself. Airlines, for example, might not want their ads to appear next to breaking news about a plane crash.

Brand safety measures 
To ensure brand safety, advertisers can buy ad space directly from trusted publishers, allowing them to directly address brand safety concerns. Advertisers and publishers may also employ third-party vendors of brand safety services that can be integrated into the advertising system. Other common preventive measures are black-lists of unsafe sites to avoid, or a white-lists of safe sites for advertising. The ads.txt (Authorized Digital Sellers) initiative from the IAB is designed to allow online media buyers to check the validity of the sellers from whom they buy.

See also 
 Reputation management

Notes 

Online advertising